Temnostoma venustum  (Williston, 1887), the  Black-banded Falsehorn , is a rare species of syrphid fly observed in the northeastern United States and adjacent Canada. Hoverflies can remain nearly motionless in flight. The  adults are also  known as flower flies for they are commonly found on flowers, from which they get both energy-giving nectar and protein rich pollen. Temnostoma adults are strong wasp mimics The larvae burrow in moist decayed wood.

Distribution
Canada, United States.

References

Eristalinae
Insects described in 1887
Diptera of North America
Taxa named by Samuel Wendell Williston